Lewis James Hardcastle (born 4 July 1998) is an English football manager and former footballer who played as a midfielder. He is the head coach at  club Daisy Hill.

Having been with Blackburn Rovers since the age of six, he turned professional at the club in December 2015 after impressing on loan at Salford City. He captained the Blackburn Rovers U23 team to the Premier League 2 Division 2 title during the 2017–18 season. He joined Port Vale on loan for the first half of the 2018–19 season, and signed permanently with Barrow in February 2019 following a spell on loan. He helped Barrow to win promotion into the Football League as champions of the National League in the 2019–20 season. 

Hardcastle retired from football in March 2021 after being diagnosed with a heart condition, aged 22. He was appointed as manager of Daisy Hill in February 2022.

Club career

Blackburn Rovers
Hardcastle joined the Academy at Blackburn Rovers at the age of six. He played 12 games for the under-18 team during the 2013–14 season. He appeared for the under-21 team in the second leg of the Under-21 Premier League Cup final defeat to Southampton at St Mary's Stadium on 20 April 2015, coming on as a 57th-minute substitute for David Carson in what ended as a 2–1 defeat after extra-time. He scored two goals in 22 appearances for the under-18's during the 2014–15 season.

On 24 September 2015, Hardcastle joined Northern Premier League Premier Division side Salford City on a one-month loan deal. The 17-year old's loan deal was later extended to three months, after which time co-manager Anthony Johnson said that "we're devastated to be losing him because he's been an integral part of what we've done". He helped the "Ammies" to reach the Second Round of the FA Cup, eliminating Notts County in the First Round with a 2–0 win at Moor Lane. He signed his first professional contract with Rovers whilst at Salford, after manager Paul Lambert gave him a -year contract. He returned to playing for the "Riversiders" youth-team, and scored the only goal of the game against Luton Town in the quarter-finals of the FA Youth Cup. He scored three goals in 26 youth-team appearances during the 2015–16 season and scored two goals in 33 youth-team appearances during the 2016–17 season, including three appearances in the EFL Trophy. In November 2017 he signed a new contract to keep him at Ewood Park until the summer of 2019. He went on to captain the under-23 team to the Premier League 2 Division 2 title at the end of the 2017–18 season.

On 30 August 2018, Hardcastle joined EFL League Two side Port Vale on loan for the rest of the 2018–19 season. He said that "the gaffer (Tony Mowbray) said to me I needed to go out and play games in men's football, come back strong and fit and you never know" and that he was "excited about the challenge" in playing in the English Football League. He made his first-team debut two days later after starting in a 2–1 defeat to Newport County at Vale Park. However he made only five starts and four substitute appearances for Neil Aspin's "Valiants" before he was recalled to Blackburn on 7 January.

Barrow
On 8 February 2019, he joined National League side Barrow on an initial one-month youth loan. The deal was made into a permanent move on 28 March after he impressed "Bluebirds" boss Ian Evatt with his dynamism and bravery in midfield; he signed a contract to run until summer 2020. He scored three goals in 41 appearances in the 2019–20 season, which was permanently suspended on 26 March due to the COVID-19 pandemic in England, with Barrow top of the table. Though the season was not resumed, Barrow went on to be promoted to the Football League as National League champions.

On 24 March 2021, Hardcastle announced his retirement from football at the age of 22, after being diagnosed with a heart problem (arrhythmogenic right ventricular cardiomyopathy).

International career
Hardcastle was called up to England C team for their friendly fixture against Wales C on 24 March 2020. The match was cancelled due to the COVID-19 pandemic in England.

Style of play
Hardcastle played as a box-to-box midfielder.

Coaching career
In February 2022, Hardcastle was announced to be new head coach of NWCFL Division One North club Daisy Hill.

Career statistics

Honours
Blackburn Rovers U23
Premier League Cup runner-up: 2015
Premier League 2 Division 2: 2017–18

Barrow
National League: 2019–20

References

1998 births
Living people
Footballers from Bolton
English footballers
Association football midfielders
Blackburn Rovers F.C. players
Salford City F.C. players
Port Vale F.C. players
Barrow A.F.C. players
Northern Premier League players
English Football League players
National League (English football) players
English football managers
Daisy Hill F.C. managers